Mehmet Shpendi, also known as Sokol Shpendi (1851–1915), a nationalist figure and guerrilla fighter, was one of the leading commanders of the Albanian Revolt of 1910, 1911, 1912  against Ottoman Empire and struggle for liberty against Kingdom of Montenegro in 1915. 

Born in the village of Shala Pecaj, Dukagjini, he represented the general uprising of the Malsia Highlands against the Ottoman Empire and the Montenegrin forces. In 1883, in Çezmë in Koplik, Mehmet Shpendi, in the name of Dukagjin, sided with Ded Gjo Luli in order to resist the commission of Xhibalit which was formed in 1856 with the purpose of tricking the Montenegrins. In 1890 Mehmet Shpendi founded the "Shala Djelmnia", an Albanian patriotic organization. In 1910 the forces of Mehmet Shpendi fought the Ottoman general Shevket Turgut Pasha, where 300 Albanian highlanders were involved in the Battle of Agri Pass against the Ottomans. The Ottoman battalions numbered 20 and were supplied with artillery cannons and modern weapons. The Ottomans were frightened by the fierce fighting of the Highlanders and they lost the battle. Shpendi later gathered his Shalë forces, joined the Highlanders of the Hoti tribe with their chieftain Ded Gjo Luli and both refused to pay Ottoman taxes and to give up their weapons. Ottoman forces pursued them and the Highlanders entered Montenegro. In 1911, Ded Gjo Luli and Mehmet Shpendi rose the flag Albanian flag for the first time in 400 years in the victorious battle of Decic. He is regarded as a local hero.

On 28 May 1911, the Highlander tribes organized a meeting at the Bridge of Shala where they decided that all of Dukagjin were to participate in an armed insurrection. The Ottoman government announced for an amnesty for the freedom fighters, seeing the risk of the spreading insurgency. The Foreign minister of the Ottomans sought to meet the leaders of the Highlanders. Ded Gjo Luli and Mehmet Shpendi is said to have told the minister that "We have nothing to speak of. We will speak with you through our barrels." After the defeat of the Ottomans, Shpendi continued to fight the Montenegrin invaders. On 15 July 1915, the Montenegrin general Radomir Vešović invited Mehmet Shpendi to a peace meeting but deceived and murdered him instead.

See also
 Shala tribe

References

Sources 
http://www.kosovarimedia.com/index.php/biblioteka/atdhetar-te-shquar/36420-mehmet-shpendi-apo-shaljani-i-tetë.html "Mehmet Shpendi and the Eight Shala Tribes"

19th-century Albanian military personnel
20th-century Albanian military personnel
Albanian Roman Catholics
Heroes of Albania
People from Scutari vilayet
Activists of the Albanian National Awakening
1851 births
1915 deaths
People from Shkodër
Shala (tribe)